Six ships of the French Navy and at least one privateer have borne the name Jupiter:

 , a 50-gun ship of the line
 A 22-gun privateer captured by Captain Taylor Penny in 1762
 , a 74-gun  ship of the line
 , a 74-gun Téméraire-class ship of the line, launched as Viala in 1795 renamed Voltaire and then Constitution later that year finally renamed Jupiter in 1803
  (1824), a brig
 , an 80-gun  ship of the line
 , a 90-gun  steam ship of the line, renamed Jupiter in 1870

See also

References

French Navy ship names